Bobby Kapp (born Robert Kaplan on April 11, 1942) is an American jazz drummer.

Life and career
He studied with Alan Dawson at Berklee College of Music before moving to New York in the 60s, where he played and recorded with alto saxophonists Marion Brown and Noah Howard, pianist Dave Burrell and tenor saxophonist Gato Barbieri. After relocating in San Miguel de Allende, Mexico, in the 90s he co-led the Fine Wine Trio with pianist Richard Wyands and bassist Gene Perla and reunited with Noah Howard for the duo album Between Two Eternities. In 2014 he released the quartet album Themes 4 Transmutation, followed by Cactus, a duo recording with pianist Matthew Shipp.

Discography

As leader/co-leader
 Themes 4 Transmutation (2014)
 Cactus (Northern Spy, 2016) with Matthew Shipp

As sideman
with Gato Barbieri
 In Search of the Mystery (ESP-Disk, 1967)
with Marion Brown
 Three for Shepp (Impulse!, 1967)
with Dave Burrell
 High (Douglas, 1968)
 High Won-High Two (Freedom, 1968)
with Noah Howard
 At Judson Hall (ESP-Disk, 1968)
 Between Two Eternities (Cadence Jazz, 2000)
with Ivo Perelman
 The Art Of Perelman-Shipp Volume 2: Tarvos (Leo, 2017)

References

External links
Official site
Bobby Kapp at Discogs

1942 births
Living people
Jazz drummers